Lars Åke Rupert Ekborg (6 June 1926 – 7 October 1969) was a Swedish actor, comedian, and singer.

Ekborg was the father of actors Dan and Anders Ekborg. He died of liver cancer in 1969. He may be heard as the recitor in the 1956 recording of Förklädd Gud by Lars-Erik Larsson with Elisabeth Söderström and Erik Saedén, conducted by Stig Westerberg.

Selected filmography
 I Am Fire and Air (1944)
 Don't Give Up (1947)
 Lars Hård (1948)
 Andersson's Kalle (1950)
 Poker (1951)
 U-Boat 39 (1952)
 Encounter with Life (1952)
 The Beat of Wings in the Night (1953)
 Summer with Monika (1953)
 The Vicious Breed (1954)
 Café Lunchrasten (1954)
 Dance in the Smoke (1954)
 The Yellow Squadron (1954)
 The Dance Hall (1955)
 Violence (1955)
 Stage Entrance (1956)
 Night Light (1957)
 No Tomorrow (1957)
 A Guest in His Own House (1957)
 Never in Your Life (1957)
 The Magician (1958)
 Fridolf Stands Up! (1958)
 Sängkammartjuven (1959)
 The Beloved Game (1959)
 Siska (1962)
 Ticket to Paradise (1962)
 The Sword in the Stone (1963) (Swedish voice of Merlin)
 Swedish Wedding Night (1964)
 Docking the Boat'' (1965)

External links

 
 

1926 births
1969 deaths
People from Uppsala
20th-century Swedish male actors
Deaths from liver cancer
Deaths from cancer in Sweden
Swedish male film actors
Swedish male voice actors